Kuru köfte (dry meatballs) is a Turkish breaded meatball, usually minced lamb or mixed with sheep, beef or chicken meat, mixed with eggs, with garlic, herbs (parsley, dill, thyme), spices and salt homogenized to form some balls, rolled on bread crumbs or flour and fried in hot oil.

See also
 Köfte
 Frikadeller
 Chiftele
 List of meatball dishes
 Mititei
 Pârjoale

Notes

Kofta